Laura Combes was a professional female bodybuilder from the United States.

Born on October 19, 1953, in New York, New York, Combes moved to Tampa, Florida in 1966 at age 13.  As a teenager she played many sports, including fencing, sailing, archery, canoeing, horseback riding, water skiing, and tennis.  Combes attended St. Petersburg College Prep School, and then went to the University of South Florida in Tampa.

In the late 1970s, she began lifting weights to rehab injuries to both knees suffered while playing rugby.  Soon, she became involved in the fledgling sport of women’s bodybuilding.  She won the first NPC Nationals in 1980, and won the AAU Ms. America title in 1981.

Combes made a dramatic national television appearance that year on the NBC series Real People.  After the airing of a taped segment about female bodybuilding in which she had been featured, Combes carried host Skip Stephenson onto stage in front of the studio audience.

Combes competed in three professional shows, retiring after a sixth-place finish at the 1982 Ms. Olympia.  Combes authored Winning Women's Bodybuilding in 1983.  Laura was inducted into the IFBB Hall of Fame in 2002.

Laura Combes was found dead in her apartment in Odessa, Florida on October 4, 1989, from acute alcohol poisoning.

Contest history
1979 Ms. Brandon Physique – 4th
1979 Ms. Florida – 5th
1979 Ms. Suncoast Body Beautiful – 2nd
1979 IFBB Best In The World – 6th
1979 Ms. Tampa Physique – 1st
1979 Ms. West Florida – 1st
1979 Ms. Northwest Florida – 1st
1980 AAU Ms. Florida – Overall Winner
1980 AAU Ms. America – 1st
1980 NPC USA Championship – 7th
1980 NPC Nationals – 1st (Overall)
1981 Pro World Championship – 6th
1981 IFBB Ms. Olympia – 4th
1982 IFBB Ms. Olympia – 6th

References

Roark, Joe, "Factoids: Featuring 2002 Hall of Fame Inductee Laura Combes", Flex, October, 2002

External links
IFBB Hall of Fame profile

American female bodybuilders
Professional bodybuilders
1953 births
1989 deaths
Sportspeople from Racine, Wisconsin
People from Odessa, Florida
20th-century American women
20th-century American people
University of South Florida alumni
Sportspeople from Tampa, Florida
St. Petersburg College alumni